Prorsisphinctes is an extinct genus from a well-known class of fossil cephalopods, the ammonites. It lived during the Middle Jurassic.

Distribution
Germany

References

Jurassic ammonites
Ammonites of Europe
Bajocian life